The Roman Catholic Diocese of San José de Mayo is a diocese of the Latin Church of the Catholic church in Uruguay.

History
The diocese was created in 1955, from territory in the Archdiocese of Montevideo and the Diocese of Salto. It covers the Departments of San José and Flores. The diocese is currently a suffragan of the Archdiocese of Montevideo. Its see is at the Cathedral of San José de Mayo.

The see of San Jose de Mayo is currently led by Bishop Edgardo Fabián Antúnez-Percíncula Kaenel, S.J., since 30 June 2021.

Bishops

Ordinaries
Luis Baccino † (20 Dec 1955 Appointed – 5 Jul 1975 Died) 
Herbé Seijas † (15 Oct 1975 Appointed – 3 May 1983 Died) 
Pablo Jaime Galimberti di Vietri (12 Dec 1983 Appointed – 16 May 2006 Appointed, Bishop of Salto) 
Arturo Eduardo Fajardo Bustamante (27 Jun 2007 Appointed – 15 Jun 2020, Appointed, Bishop of Salto)
Edgardo Fabián Antúnez-Percíncula Kaenel, S.J. (30 Jun 2021 Appointed – present)

Auxiliary bishop
Herbé Seijas † (1975), appointed Bishop here

See also
List of churches in the Diocese of San José de Mayo
List of Roman Catholic dioceses in Uruguay

References

External links
 
 Website - Diocese of San José de Mayo 

Religion in San José Department
Religion in Flores Department
San Jose de Mayo
San Jose de Mayo
Christian organizations established in 1955
1955 establishments in Uruguay
San Jose de Mayo